Parzyce may refer to the following places in Poland:
Parzyce, Lower Silesian Voivodeship (south-west Poland)
Parzyce, Łódź Voivodeship (central Poland)